Punta del Este is a seaside city and peninsula on the Atlantic Coast in the Maldonado Department of southeastern Uruguay. Starting as a small town, Punta del Este later became internationally known as a resort for the Latin and North American jet set and tourists. The city has been referred to as "the Monaco of the South", "The Pearl of the Atlantic",  "the Hamptons of South America","the Miami Beach of South America", or "the St. Tropez of South America".  

There is an extensive list of famous people who visited, resided or acquired vacation properties in Punta del Este and its surroundings.

Among many other historic events, Punta del Este hosted the Whitbread Around the World yacht races from 1985 to 1994 and participated in the race with a yacht under the name 'Uruguay Natural'. Punta del Este also hosted the 1967 American Summit attended by U.S. President Lyndon Johnson, and the start of the Uruguay Round of international trade negotiations in 1986 that ultimately led to the creation of the World Trade Organization in 1994. The city was also host for the  2014 Formula E Championship qualifying with the presence of the former Toro Rosso Formula 1 racer Jean-Eric Vergne from France, and the Gran Premio de Punta del Este receiving national, South American and international competitions.

In addition to international film festivals, gastronomy and first-class hotels, the region has protected natural reserves such as Isla de Lobos, Gorriti Island, La Barra, or the Arboretum Lussich. Popular landmarks in the area include the La Mano giant sculpture, the Santorini-styled complex Casapueblo, the Rafael Viñoly designed Puente Garzón bridge, and the Museum of the Sea.

Although the city has a year-round population of about 12,400, the summer season greatly adds to this number, and its residents average 450,000.

Geography

Location

Climate
Punta del Este has an oceanic climate (Cfb, according to the Köppen climate classification), with pleasant summers and cool winters. Because of the average temperature of the hottest month near 22 °C, the climate is close to a humid subtropical climate (Cfa). It is similar to southeastern Australia.

History
The first Europeans to set foot in what is now Punta del Este were the Spanish at the beginning of the 16th century. However, the colonization of the area actually began around Maldonado at the end of the 18th century due to Portuguese expansionism.  Punta del Este and its surroundings (Maldonado and Punta Ballena) at the end of the 19th century were kilometers of sand and dunes, but in 1896 Antonio Lussich bought  of uninhabited land and there he started a botanical garden, Arboretum Lussich, and planted trees and plants from all over the world. Later the trees started to spread on their own, and now the area is full of mostly Pines, Eucalyptus, Acacias and various species of bushes.

On 5 July 1907, it was declared a "Pueblo" (village) by Act of Ley 3.186. Its status was elevated to "Ciudad" (city) on 2 July 1957 by the Act of Ley Nº 12.397.

During the 1970s, the city faced a decline in the number of tourists (specially from Argentina) as a result of both terrorist threats by the Tupamaros guerrilla organization and an increase in the number of working class hotels and less luxurious residences. The 1973 Uruguayan coup d'état took place in Uruguay on 27 June 1973 and marked the beginning of the civic-military dictatorship which lasted until 1985. Juan María Bordaberry closed parliament and ruled with the assistance of a junta of military generals. The official reason was to crush the Tupamaros. The Marxist urban guerrilla movement and leftist trade union federations called a general strike and occupation of factories. The strike lasted just over two weeks. It was ended with most of the trade union leaders in jail, dead, or exiled to Argentina. As part of the coup all associations including trade unions were declared illegal and banned; the Constitution of Uruguay of 1967 was practically voided. Unions, gatherings of any kind, and political parties remained illegal until a general strike in 1984 forced the military to accept civilian rule and the restoration of democracy in 1985. As a way to help close their open wounds, the Uruguayan people chose a former revolutionary and farmer to serve as the 40th President of Uruguay from 2010 to 2015, José Mujica, a former guerrilla with the Tupamaros who was tortured and imprisoned for 14 years during the military dictatorship in the 1970s and 1980s. A member of the Broad Front coalition of left-wing parties, Mujica was Minister of Livestock, Agriculture, and Fisheries from 2005 to 2008, a Senator afterwards, and then became an elected President. 

Punta del Este had a formidable real estate unprecedented development around the 1980s called the 'construction boom' in the spa flourished apartment towers and hotel complexes. Since then, with ups and downs conditioned by the economic cycles of the country and the region, real estate activity has become another engine of the economy of Punta del Este. In 2022, real estate market specialists see another exponential growth throughout the locality as it sits as a place to live year-round.

Population

In 2011 Punta del Este city proper had a population of 9,277 and 23,954 households and apartments. Argentines, Brazilians and Europeans are gradually choosing Punta del Este as their permanent residence. Some of the reasons are peace in the midst of nature and increasing educational offerings.

 
Source: Instituto Nacional de Estadística de Uruguay

Panorama

Coastline

Punta del Este's scenic coastline is divided in two regions: Brava (Spanish: "fierce") and Mansa ("tame"). The limit between the two marks the end of the Río de la Plata and the beginning of the Atlantic Ocean, and split is signaled by the Mano de Punta del Este, which the sculptor designed to warn swimmers about the danger of rough waves. Beaches on the Mansa side feature thick and golden sand, while on the Brava side the sand is white and fine. Every beach of the peninsula has public access.

La Barra is popular for nautical sports and fishing during the day. At later hours, La Barra becomes a central attraction for the younger generation. Starting from the end of December through to the second week of January, this location becomes a place for the local people as well as tourists to gather at the night life festivities. Other areas include the resort of El Tesoro, Montoya beach, Bikini beach and Manantiales beach. These beaches are a favourite spot for younger people as well as for many celebrities from both Uruguay and Argentina.

Once abundant, southern right whales are re-colonizing in the area, which helped create a whale sanctuary off Latin America, whose establishment had been prevented for near a decade by whaling nations like Japan. Unlike the majority of Uruguayan coasts, appearances of orcas have been documented in the area; most notably around Isla de Lobos.

Landmarks

The city has much colonial architecture contrasting with more modern buildings. Nowadays it has a scenic shore, typical resort houses, modern buildings, a port with mooring capacity, department stores, restaurants, and pubs. There are several large houses, and gardens lined with plants.

An iconic and historic building rises on the 19th stop of the Brava Beach, the famous Hotel L'Auberge Inicio with its 70 year old water tower, continues to be a leader in hospitality and gastronomy with its unique rooms and still serving its traditional Belgian waffles Waffles with home made sauces.

Punta del Este was originally home to the first Conrad Hotel in South America.

Gorlero Avenue, the main avenue of Punta del Este has commercial galleries, restaurants, cinemas, casinos, shops.

Artigas square, over Gorlero Ave is the place where there is a popular handicraft market.

Punta del Este is well known for organizing the summit in which the WTO was created. The Formula E has hosted several races, broadcast worldwide, in the city, based on its "absolutely landmark cityscape". In 2017, the China-Latin America Forum took place in the Punta del Este Convention Center.

Enjoy Punta del Este (formerly Conrad Resort & Casino)

Enjoy Punta del Este (formerly Conrad Punta del Este) is a hotel and casino designed by Guillermo Gómez Platero. The hotel's construction started in 1993 and finished in 1997. It offers 294 rooms, including 41 luxury suites. It was originally operated by Hilton Hotels & Resorts under the brand "Conrad". The property was owned by Caesars Entertainment Corporation and Hilton Hotels & Resorts until it was sold to the Chilean group Enjoy S.A. in 2017. Hilton's affiliation ceased on April 1, 2018.

The casino hosted the partypoker Latin American Poker Championships (LAPC) which lasted between February 24 and March 4, 2018, and had an attendance of 1,137 players.

Fundación Pablo Atchugarry

One of the leading artistic institutions of Uruguay, the Fundación Pablo Atchugarry (Pablo Atchugarry Foundation) is dedicated to the promotion of arts and culture in Punta del Este. The foundation was created in 2007 by international sculpture artist Pablo Atchugarry, with the aim to keep a dialogue between art and nature. During the summer season (December to February) the foundation proposes a series of exhibitions and events such as concerts of lyrical to popular music, ballet representations and more. Once a year, the institution present an iconic exhibition from a major artist or collection. Over the past five years, the works of František Kupka, Le Corbusier, Collection MACBA, José Gurvich and Pablo Atchugarry have been exhibited in the main building. The premises of the institution are composed of the sculptor's workshop, a building with three exhibition rooms, an auditorium, an open-air stage for a variety of shows, a restaurant, a didactic room where sculpture, painting, drawing and ceramic classes are held, and finally a space which holds the permanent collection and the work of the founder. A 30-hectare sculpture park surrounds the compound.

Punta del Este Lighthouse 
The lighthouse is 45 metres tall, and the crystal panels which are part of its illumination system were brought from France. It works by electricity, with acetylene gas as emergency backup. It is possible to climb the 150 steps of its spiral staircase.

Gorriti Island 

This island of 21 hectares of surface is daily visited to enjoy its two beaches: Garden Port and Honda beach. It consists of a natural port, with ships anchoring close to it, and it also became a popular area to practice water sports.

Transportation

The city is served by Capitán de Corbeta Carlos A. Curbelo International Airport, being the second most important of Uruguay, located near Laguna del Sauce on the outskirts of the city. This modern airport opened in 1996. It offers domestic and international flights within the region.

The bus companies Copsa and Cot connect the airport with Punta del Este, and there are several private taxi and remise services available.

Also in the area is El Jagüel Airport, which is much closer to Punta del Este;  it is only used by small-sized private aircraft.

Places of worship
Punta del Este has numerous Jewish temples and Catholic churches:
 Parish Church of Our Lady of Candelaria (Roman Catholic)
 Fátima Chapel (Roman Catholic)
 St. Raphael Chapel (Roman Catholic)
 Rafael Temple (Jewish)
 Beit Yaacov (Jewish) 
 Beit Jabad (Jewish-Chabad)

Activities
Among its attractions, the city offers music and cinema festivals, whale sightseeing, and fine dining.

The city hosted the  Punta del Este ePrix in 2014, 2015, and 2018. The street circuit of 2.8 km of length runs along Punta del Este's harbour and has been nicknamed the Monte Carlo of South America.

The  Uruguay Sevens rugby competition held in Montevideo began as Punta Del Este Sevens in 1989.

Notable people
 Margaret Cooper (1918–2016), British cryptographer, born in Punta del Este
 Nahitan Nandez (1995–), Uruguayan football player, born in Punta del Este

References

External links 

Official site of Punta del Este municipality

 
Populated places in the Maldonado Department
Populated places established in 1907
Port cities and towns in Uruguay